These are the official results of the men's 12.5 km pursuit event at the Biathlon World Championships 2009 in Pyeongchang, South Korea.

Men's Pursuit